For the Masses is the second studio album by British grindie band Hadouken!. It was recorded in Groningen, The Netherlands during the Summer of 2009, and preceded by the release of the M.A.D. EP.

Track listing
All songs written by Hadouken! and Noisia

 "Ugly" was featured as a dub mix on the M.A.D. EP.

Chart position

Release
The album was released on 25 January 2010. Fans who pre-ordered the album through the official website received a signed copy a few days early, with their name included on a mini poster inside the case.

Reception

Reviews for the album have been mostly negative. Drowned in Sound stated that "This aggressive tone... breaks new boundaries in something absolutely ridiculous", whilst NME feels "James Smith is in the throes of an aneurysm. By the end of For the Masses you might well be wishing one on yourself just for sweet relief." Both reviewers gave the album 3 out of 10 stars. One notable exception to this negative trend was Q, whose reviewer called the album "addictive, energizing, and catchy as hell."

Hadouken!
 James Smith - vocals, programming
 Daniel "Pilau" Rice - guitar, synthesizer
 Christopher Purcell - bass, synthesizer, samples
 Alice Spooner - synthesizer
 Nick Rice - drums, programming

References

Hadouken! albums
2010 albums